Dangerous Passage is a 1944 American film noir drama film directed by William Berke, starring Robert Lowery and Phyllis Brooks.

Plot summary

Oil company employee Joe Beck (Robert Lowery) is stationed in the jungle in Honduras. When his grandfather back in Texas dies, he inherits $200,000. In a nearby port he meets with the testament executor, attorney Daniel Bergstrom (Charles Arnt) to receive the good news, but when he is to return to the jungle, he is followed by a suspicious man hired by the attorney, who tries to knock him out. Joe instead manages to kill the man, and boards a ship in the port.

On the ship, the Merman, is Dawson (Alec Craig), a steward who helped Joe against his unknown assailant. Also on the ship are Captain Saul (William Edmunds) and his mate, Buck Harris (Victor Kilian). Among the few passengers is the alluring Nita Paxton (Phyllis Brooks), a cabaret artist whom Joe takes a liking to the minute he boards the ship.

Before the ship lands in its first port on the cruise, Dawson is murdered, and Joe gets rid of the body by feeding it to the fish, to avoid being blamed for his death. On shore in Los Altos, Joe and Nita go off romancing together. Upon their return to the ship, Joe discovers that Bergstrom has come aboard and brought a man calling himself Joe Beck (Jack La Rue). Joe instantly suspects Nita of being in cahoots with Bergstrom, trying to trick him out of his inheritance. She then confides in him, that Dawson was an undercover agent for an insurance company, suspecting the captain and his crew of insurance fraud. She is trying to finish his work after he disappeared.

Waiting for Joe in his cabin are Bergstrom and the impostor, who hold him at gun point, demanding he give them his ID and papers. Joe overpowers the impostor, grabs the gun and forces the men to leave his cabin.

In the middle of the night, Joe wakes up from the ship crashing into some sharp rocks. He tries to stop Saul and take the wheel, but is knocked unconscious and locked into his cabin. Nita manages to break down the door with an axe and free him. The only ones left on the ship are the two of them and Bergstrom and his impostor, since the rest of the crew has escaped on a life raft. Bergstrom suggests they work together to stay alive, assuring Joe he has given up his plan to take his money.

Still, when they hear on the radio that planes are sent out to rescue them, Bergstrom makes Joe fall hard into a deep hole in the deck. He is again knocked out and wakes up in a hospital a few days later.

Joe goes to Galveston, Texas, to collect his identification which he has sent in advance by mail, but finds that Nita has already been there in his place and fetched the papers. He tracks her down and discovers her with Bergstrom and the impostor. They threaten to kill her, demanding the papers.

Joe climbs into the apartment through a window, and in self-defence manages to shoot and kill the impostor just as Bergstrom gets his hands on the papers. Bergstrom calls the police, trying to get Joe arrested for the impostor's murder, but Joe overpowers him and when the police arrive, Bergstrom is arrested instead. Joe and Nita reunite with a kiss.

Cast 
Robert Lowery as Joe Beck
Phyllis Brooks as Nita Paxton
Charles Arnt as Daniel Bergstrom
Jack La Rue as Mike Zomano
John Eldredge as Vaughn
Victor Kilian as Buck Harris, 1st Mate
Alec Craig as Dawson the Steward
William Edmunds as Captain Saul

Production
The film was written by Daniel Mainwaring, who wrote books under the name "Geoffrey Homes", some of which had been filmed by Pine-Thomas. Mainwaring signed a long-term contract with Pine Thomas in May 1944 to write scripts of which this was the first.

Filming started 3 August 1944.

References

External links 

1944 films
1940s English-language films
Paramount Pictures films
American black-and-white films
Films directed by William A. Berke
American drama films
1944 drama films
Films set on ships
1940s American films